The Baltimore Mariners were an indoor football team based in Baltimore, Maryland. The team was a member of American Indoor Football. The team was founded when the American Indoor Football Association expelled the Baltimore Blackbirds for negotiating with another league. The AIFA maintained the lease rights to 1st Mariner Arena, so the Mariners were the league's replacement. On September 3, 2010, team owner Dwayne Wells was arrested on charges of wire fraud from an engineering firm he partially owned, allegedly using embezzled money from the firm to buy stakes in the Mariners franchise.  Wells forfeited his ownership of the team, causing the Mariners to fold after the 2010 season. The Southern Indoor Football League, as successor to the eastern half of the AIFA, held the lease on the arena, now called Baltimore Arena, until it folded in 2011. The Mariners, after three seasons out of play, returned for one final season in 2014, winning the league championship before folding again.  The Mariners have since been succeeded by the Baltimore Brigade of the Arena Football League in 2017.

History

Expansion (2008–2009)

2009 season schedule

First Championship and collapse (2010)
On March 21, 2010, the Mariners became the first team in AIFA history to earn a shutout win, as they won over the Fayetteville Guard 59–0.

On April 24, 2010, Baltimore continued its record-setting performances during a 91–19 home win over the Guard.  They would set the team record for most points in one half (59) and the most points in one game (91).

On June 26, 2010, Baltimore became the first team in AIFA history to finish the regular season undefeated with a record of 14–0. Baltimore went on to win the AIFA Championship and complete their undefeated season with a 57–42 victory on July 25, 2010 over the Western Conference champions, the Wyoming Cavalry.  In winning AIFA Bowl IV, the Mariners not only brought the city of Baltimore its first pro indoor football title, but also increased the city's number of overall pro football championships to eight (Baltimore Colts (NFL) in 1958, 1959, 1968, and 1970; Baltimore Stars (USFL) in 1985; Baltimore Stallions (CFL) in 1995;Baltimore Ravens (NFL) in 2000 and 2012; and, Baltimore Mariners (AIFA) in 2010).

2010 season schedule

^ - indicates playoff game

The coach of the undefeated 2010 Mariners, Chris Simpson, would move to the Richmond Raiders for the 2011 season.

In October 2011, the AIFA announced that it would include a team from Maryland, presumably the remains/continuation of the Mariners, in its 2012 relaunch; the league more explicitly stated that the Mariners would be revived for the 2014 season.

Rebirth (2013–2014)
In September 2013, the AIF announced that Baltimore would be re-joining the league in 2014. On October 9, 2013, the Mariners announced Ron Meehan would be returning as head coach. In 2014, they won the AIF Championship against the Cape Fear Heroes.

2014 season schedule

^ - indicates playoff game

Statistics and records

Season-by-season results
Note: The finish, wins, losses, and ties columns list regular season results and exclude any postseason play.

* Season currently in progress

References

External links
 Official website
Mariners' 2008 stats
Mariners' 2009 stats
Mariners' 2010 stats

American football teams in Baltimore
Defunct American football teams in Maryland
Former American Indoor Football teams
American football teams established in 2007
American football teams disestablished in 2014
2007 establishments in Maryland
2014 disestablishments in Maryland